Lawrence Roger Lumley, 11th Earl of Scarbrough,  (27 July 1896 – 29 June 1969) was a British Conservative politician and British Army general.

Background
Lumley was the son of Brigadier General Osbert Lumley (1857-1923), youngest child and son of the 9th Earl. His mother was Constance Ellinor Wilson-Patten (1864-1933), granddaughter of John Wilson-Patten, 1st Baron Winmarleigh. He attended Eton College and Magdalen College, Oxford.

Career
Lumley followed his father into the military, passing out from the Royal Military College, Sandhurst. He was commissioned a second lieutenant in the 11th Hussars on 26 January 1916, and was promoted to lieutenant on 26 July 1917. He served in France during World War I. He was demobilised on 3 June 1919, with the rank of lieutenant, but retained a reserve lieutenant's commission in the 11th Hussars, as well as being attached to the Yorkshire Dragoons. From 1920 to 1921, he was attached to an Officer Training Corps (OTC) University Contingent, with the local rank of captain.

Lumley sat in the House of Commons as Member of Parliament (MP) for Kingston upon Hull East 1922–29, then York 1931–37. In 1923 he was Parliamentary Private Secretary to William Ormsby-Gore, from 1924–26 to Sir Austen Chamberlain and subsequently to Anthony Eden. On 8 March 1931, he was promoted to captain in the reserves in both the 11th Hussars and the Yorkshire Dragoons. He was brevetted to the rank of major in the Yorkshire Dragoons on 1 January 1937, and was awarded the Efficiency Decoration on 11 May. In 1937, he was appointed Governor of Bombay, serving until 1943, when he was appointed Knight Grand Commander of the Order of the Star of India. Upon his return from India, Lumley served as acting Major-General in World War II. Following the War, he continued his connections with the Army, as an honorary colonel.
He succeeded to the Earldom of Scarbrough in 1945 following the death of his uncle. He served as Lord Chamberlain from 1952 to 1963 and chancellor of the University of Durham from 1958 to 1969. He was made a Knight of the Garter in 1948.

Outside politics, the Earl had a keen interest in Asian and African studies. He presided over the Interdepartmental Commission of Enquiry on Oriental, Slavonic, East European and African Studies set up after the Second World War to consider how Britain might maintain and increase the links it had built up during the war in the geographical areas under the Commission's consideration. The Commission's report, presented in 1947, argued for considerable strengthening of university departments' capacity to carry out research and training related to these areas, and for significant funds to be made available to this end. However, after five years of strong growth following the presentation of the Scarbrough report, in 1952 much of the funding was withdrawn.

Lumley was initiated into freemasonry on 3 May 1923 in Apollo University Lodge No 357 in Oxford. From 1951 to 1967 he served as the Grand Master of the United Grand Lodge of England, during which time he was also made an honorary member of Isaac Newton University Lodge when attending its centenary. Lumley, alongside Eric James, Baron James of Rusholme was a Patron of the Yorkshire Philosophical Society.

Family

Lumley married Katherine Isobel McEwen, sister of Sir John McEwen, 1st Baronet on 12 July 1922 at St Margaret's, Westminster. They had five children:

References

Further reading

External links 
 
 

1896 births
1969 deaths
People educated at Eton College
Alumni of Magdalen College, Oxford
British Army personnel of World War I
British Army generals of World War II
Chancellors of Durham University
Lumley, Lawrence
Conservative Party (UK) hereditary peers
Deputy Lieutenants of Durham
Governors of Bombay
Presidents of the Royal Asiatic Society
Grand Masters of the United Grand Lodge of England
Graduates of the Royal Military College, Sandhurst
Grand Crosses 1st class of the Order of Merit of the Federal Republic of Germany
Knights Grand Commander of the Order of the Indian Empire
Knights Grand Commander of the Order of the Star of India
Knights Grand Cross of the Royal Victorian Order
Knights of the Garter
Lord-Lieutenants of the West Riding of Yorkshire
Members of the Privy Council of the United Kingdom
Permanent Lords-in-Waiting
Lumley, Lawrence
Lumley, Lawrence
Lumley, Lawrence
Lumley, Lawrence
Lumley, Lawrence
UK MPs who inherited peerages
11th Hussars officers
Queen's Own Yorkshire Dragoons officers
Foreign Office personnel of World War II
Earls of Scarbrough
Ministers in the Churchill caretaker government, 1945
Members of Isaac Newton University Lodge
Members of the Yorkshire Philosophical Society